Indian Creek is a Mennonite settlement that is also an administrative village in Orange Walk District in Belize. Its inhabitants are German-speaking so called "Russian" Mennonites. According to the 2010 census, Little Belize had a population of 903 people in 150 households.

See also 

Mennonites in Belize

References 

Mennonitism in Belize
Populated places in Orange Walk District
Russian Mennonite diaspora in Belize